This is a list of references to seer stones in the Latter Day Saint movement history.  The role and understanding of seer stones in the Church of Jesus Christ of Latter-day Saints has shifted throughout its history.  References to the Urim and Thummim (Latter Day Saints), spectacles, and interpreters are also included, as the term has been conflated at times with the term seer stones.

References prior to 1830

References from 1830 through 1839

References between 1840 and 1859

References between 1860 and 1879

References from 1880 through 1889

References from 1890 through 1889

References after 1900

See also

References 

History of the Latter Day Saint movement
Book of Mormon artifacts
Latter Day Saint terms
Sacred rocks
Seership in Mormonism